Roel Clark Campos (born 1949) is an American business lawyer.

Early life and education 
Campos earned his J.D. from Harvard Law School in 1979, his M.B.A. from the University of California, Los Angeles in 1972, and in 1971 earned his B.S. from the United States Air Force Academy.

Career 
He served as Securities and Exchange Commissioner between 2002–07 and is now a partner with the law firm Hughes Hubbard & Reed LLP. Campos was named to then President-elect Barack Obama's economic advisory board and was considered a possible successor to former SEC chairman Christopher Cox. He is a current member of the Committee on Capital Markets Regulation, an independent and nonpartisan 501(c)(3) research organization dedicated to improving the regulation of U.S. capital markets. In 2008, Campos was appointed a member of the Board of Trustees of the International Valuation Standards Council, and in December 2011 as interim Chairman.

References

External links
Campos' biography at SEC.gov
Campos' profile at Cooley Godward Kronish

1949 births
Living people
Hispanic and Latino American people
People from Harlingen, Texas
UCLA Anderson School of Management alumni
Harvard Law School alumni
Members of the U.S. Securities and Exchange Commission
United States Air Force Academy alumni
United States Air Force officers
George W. Bush administration personnel